Robert Egbeta (born 23 June 1989) is a Nigerian footballer who can play as central defender, defensive midfield and right full back. He recently played as midfielder/defender for Llaneros F.C. in Colombia.

National team
Egbeta played as right full back in the squad that was called for the 2007 FIFA U-20 World Cup, where Nigeria was defeated by Chile in the quarter-final.

Titles

References

1989 births
Living people
Nigerian footballers
Nigerian expatriate footballers
Nigeria under-20 international footballers
Expatriate footballers in Colombia
Llaneros F.C. players
Association football defenders
Sportspeople from Warri